Ritchie Perry (born 1942) is a British writer of spy and adventure crime fiction. He has also written novels under the name John Allen, as well as a book on Brazil and some books for children.
Sadly Ritchie died in February 2022

Works
 The fall guy, 1972
 A hard man to kill, 1973
 Ticket to ride, 1973
 Holiday with a vengeance, 1974
 Your money and your wife, 1975
 One good death deserves another, 1976
 Brazil: the land and its people, 1977
 Dead end, 1977
 Dutch courage, 1978
 Bishop's pawn, 1979
 Grand slam, 1980
 Fool's mate, 1981
 Foul up, 1982
 MacAllister, 1984
 Kolwezi, 1985
 Presumed dead, 1987
 Comeback, 1991

References

1942 births
Living people
British crime writers
British spy fiction writers
20th-century British novelists
British children's writers
British male novelists
20th-century British male writers